Koberovy is a municipality and village in Jablonec nad Nisou District in the Liberec Region of the Czech Republic. It has about 1,000 inhabitants.

Administrative parts
Villages of Besedice, Chloudov, Hamštejn, Michovka, Prosíčka, Vrát and Zbirohy are administrative parts of Koberovy.

History
The first written mention of Koberovy is from 1190.

References

Villages in Jablonec nad Nisou District